Torcafol or Torcafols (fl. 1175–1200) is the nickname of an occitanian troubadour from Gévaudan.

He is known for his sirventes with his rival Garin d'Apchier.

Sources 
  
  
  
  

12th-century French troubadours
People from Lozère